Lorenzo Esteban Herrera (August 2, 1896 – 1960) is a Venezuelan singer and composer of the first half of the 20th century.

Sources 
Based on Guillermo Ramos Flamerich about the life of Lorenzo Herrera

External links
 Lorenzo Herrera recordings at the Discography of American Historical Recordings.

1896 births
1960 deaths
Date of death missing
People from Caracas
Venezuelan composers
Male composers
Venezuelan folk guitarists
Male guitarists
Venezuelan folk singers
20th-century composers
20th-century guitarists
20th-century Venezuelan male singers